Mark Lavon "Levon" Helm (May 26, 1940 – April 19, 2012) was an American musician who achieved fame as the drummer and one of the three lead vocalists for the Band, for which he was inducted into the Rock and Roll Hall of Fame in 1994. Helm was known for his deeply soulful, country-accented voice, multi-instrumental ability, and creative drumming style, highlighted on many of the Band's recordings, such as "The Weight", "Up on Cripple Creek", and "The Night They Drove Old Dixie Down".

Helm also had a successful career as a film actor, appearing as Loretta Lynn's father in Coal Miner's Daughter (1980), as Chuck Yeager's friend and colleague Captain Jack Ridley in The Right Stuff (1983), as a Tennessee firearms expert in Shooter (2007), and as General John Bell Hood in In the Electric Mist (2009).

In 1998, Helm was diagnosed with throat cancer which caused him to lose his singing voice. After treatment, his cancer eventually went into remission, and he gradually regained the use of his voice. His 2007 comeback album Dirt Farmer earned the Grammy Award for Best Traditional Folk Album in February 2008, and in November of that year, Rolling Stone magazine ranked him No. 91 in its list of 100 Greatest Singers of All Time,. In 2010, Electric Dirt, his 2009 follow-up to Dirt Farmer, won the first Grammy Award for Best Americana Album, a category inaugurated in 2010. In 2011, his live album Ramble at the Ryman won the Grammy in the same category. In 2016, Rolling Stone magazine ranked him No. 22 in its list of 100 Greatest Drummers of All Time.

Biography

Early years
Born Mark Lavon Helm in Elaine, Arkansas, Helm grew up in Turkey Scratch, a hamlet of Marvell, Arkansas. His parents, Nell and Diamond Helm, were cotton farmers who shared a strong affinity for music. They encouraged their children to play and sing at a young age. He saw Bill Monroe and His Blue Grass Boys at the age of six and decided to become a musician. Helm began playing the guitar at the age of eight and also played drums.

Arkansas in the 1940s and '50s stood at the confluence of a variety of musical styles, including traditional Delta blues, electric blues, country (including old-time music) and the incipient genre of rhythm and blues. Helm was influenced by each of these styles, which he heard on the Grand Ole Opry on radio station WSM and R&B on radio station WLAC in Nashville. He also saw the last vestiges of minstrelsy and other traveling variety shows, such as F. S. Wolcott's Original Rabbit's Foot Minstrels, which featured top Black artists of the era.

A key early influence on Helm was Sonny Boy Williamson II, who played electric blues and early rhythm and blues on the King Biscuit Time radio show on KFFA in Helena and performed regularly in Marvell with blues guitarist Robert Lockwood, Jr. In his 1993 autobiography, This Wheel's on Fire: Levon Helm and the Story of the Band, Helm describes watching Williamson's drummer, James "Peck" Curtis, intently during a live performance in the early 1950s and later imitating this R&B drumming style. Helm established his first band, the Jungle Bush Beaters, while in high school.

Helm also witnessed some of the earliest performances by early rock and roll and rockabilly artists, including Elvis Presley, Conway Twitty, Bo Diddley and fellow Arkansan Ronnie Hawkins. At age 17, Helm began playing in clubs and bars around Helena.

The Hawks
While he was still in high school, Helm was invited to join Ronnie Hawkins' band, the Hawks, a popular bar and club act in the South and Canada where rockabilly acts were very successful. Helm's mother insisted that he graduate from high school before touring with Hawkins, but he was able to play with the Hawks locally on weekends. After his graduation in 1958, Helm joined the Hawks as a full-time member and they moved to Toronto where they signed with Roulette Records in 1959 and released several singles, including a few hits.

Helm reported in his autobiography that fellow Hawks band members had difficulty pronouncing "Lavon" correctly and started calling him "Levon" because it was easier to pronounce.

In 1961, Helm with bassist Rick Danko backed jazz guitarist Lenny Breau on several tracks recorded at Hallmark Studios in Toronto. These tracks are included on the 2003 release The Hallmark Sessions.

By the early 1960s, Helm and Hawkins had recruited an all-Canadian lineup of musicians: guitarist Robbie Robertson, bassist Rick Danko, pianist Richard Manuel, and organist Garth Hudson, all of whom were multi-instrumentalists. In 1963, the band parted ways with Hawkins and started touring as Levon and the Hawks and later as the Canadian Squires, before changing back to the Hawks. They recorded two singles but remained mostly a popular touring bar band in Texas, Arkansas, Canada, and on the East Coast of the United States where they found regular summer club gigs on the New Jersey shore.

By the mid-1960s, songwriter and musician Bob Dylan was interested in performing electric rock music and asked the Hawks to be his backing band. Disheartened by fans' negative response to Dylan's new sound, Helm left the group in the autumn of 1965 for what turned out to be a two-year layoff, being replaced by a range of touring drummers (most notably Mickey Jones) and Manuel, who began to double on the instrument. He spent time with his family in Arkansas, and undertook sojourns in Los Angeles, where he experimented with LSD  and performed with Bobby Keys, and Memphis and New Orleans, where he worked on a nearby oil platform). In the autumn of 1967, after what would later be called "the Summer of Love", he returned to the group.

After the Hawks toured Europe with Dylan, they followed him back to the U.S., remaining under salary, and settled near Dylan's home in Woodstock, New York. The Hawks recorded a large number of demos and practice tapes in nearby West Saugerties, New York, playing almost daily with Dylan, who had completely withdrawn from public life following a motorcycle accident in July 1966. These recordings were widely bootlegged and were partially released officially in 1975 as The Basement Tapes. The songs and themes developed during this period played a crucial role in the group's future direction and style. The Hawks also began writing their own songs, with Danko and Manuel also sharing writing credits with Dylan on a few songs.

The Band

Helm returned to the group, then referred to simply as "the band", as it was known around Woodstock. While contemplating a recording contract, Helm had dubbed the band "The Crackers". However, when Robertson and their new manager Albert Grossman worked out the contracts, the group's name was given as "The Band". Under these contracts, the Band was contracted to Grossman, who in turn contracted their services to Capitol Records. This arrangement allowed the Band to release recordings on other labels if the work was done in support of Dylan. Thus the Band was able to play on Dylan's Planet Waves album and to release The Last Waltz, both on other labels. The Band also recorded their own album Music from Big Pink (1968), which catapulted them into stardom. Helm was the Band's only American member.

On Music from Big Pink, Manuel was the most prominent vocalist and Helm sang backup and harmony, with the exception of "The Weight". However, as Manuel's health deteriorated and Robbie Robertson's songwriting increasingly looked to the South for influence and direction, subsequent albums relied more and more on Helm's vocals, alone or in harmony with Danko. Helm was primarily a drummer and vocalist and increasingly sang lead, although, like all his bandmates, he was also a multi-instrumentalist. On occasion Manuel switched to drums while Helm played mandolin, guitar, or bass guitar (while Danko played fiddle) on some songs. Helm played the 12-string guitar backdrop to "Daniel and the Sacred Harp".

Helm remained with the Band until their farewell performance on Thanksgiving Day, November 25, 1976, which was the subject of the documentary film The Last Waltz, directed by Martin Scorsese. Helm repudiated his involvement with The Last Waltz shortly after the completion of its final scenes. In his autobiography Helm criticized the film and Robertson who produced it.

Solo, acting and the reformed Band
With the breakup of the Band in its original form, Helm began working on a solo-ensemble album, Levon Helm & the RCO All-Stars, with Paul Butterfield, Fred Carter, Jr., Emmeretta Marks, Howard Johnson, Steve Cropper, Donald "Duck" Dunn, Booker T. Jones, and others. Levon Helm and the RCO All-Stars recorded Live at The Palladium NYC, New Year's Eve 1977. The CD album released in March 2006 features over one hour of blues-rock music performed by an ensemble featuring Levon Helm (drums/vocals), Dr. John (keys/vocals), Paul Butterfield (harmonica/vocals), Fred Carter (guitar/vocals), Donald "Duck" Dunn (bass), Cropper (guitar), Lou Marini (saxophones), Howard Johnson (tuba/baritone sax), Tom "Bones" Malone (trombone), and Alan Rubin (trumpet).

This was followed in 1978 by the solo album Levon Helm. More solo albums were released in 1980 and 1982: American Son and (once again) Levon Helm, both produced by Fred Carter, Jr. He also participated in musician Paul Kennerley's 1980 country music concept album, The Legend of Jesse James singing the role of Jesse James alongside Johnny Cash, Emmylou Harris, Charlie Daniels, Albert Lee, and others.

In addition to his work as musician, Helm also acted in several dramatic films. He was cast as Loretta Lynn's father in the 1980 film Coal Miner's Daughter, followed three years later by a role as U.S. Air Force test pilot and engineer Capt. Jack Ridley, in The Right Stuff. Helm was also the latter film's narrator. 1987's under-appreciated End of the Line featured Levon as a small-town railroad employee alongside Wilford Brimley and Kevin Bacon. He played a Kentucky backwoods preacher in Fire Down Below. He played an eccentric old man in the 2005 film The Three Burials of Melquiades Estrada and appeared as Gen. John Bell Hood in the 2009 film In the Electric Mist. He also had a brief cameo as a weapons expert in the film Shooter with Mark Wahlberg.

In 1983, the Band reunited without Robbie Robertson, at first playing with an expanded lineup that included the entire Cate Brothers Band, but in 1985 paring down and adding Jim Weider on guitar. In 1986, while on tour Manuel committed suicide. Helm, Danko, and Hudson continued in the Band, adding pianist Richard Bell and drummer/vocalist Randy Ciarlante and releasing the album Jericho in 1993 and High on the Hog in 1996. The final album from the Band was the 30th anniversary album, Jubilation released in 1998.

In 1989, Helm and Danko toured with drummer Ringo Starr as part of his All-Starr Band. Other musicians in the band included singer and guitarist Joe Walsh, singer and pianist Dr. John, singer and guitarist Nils Lofgren, singer Billy Preston, saxophonist Clarence Clemons, and drummer Jim Keltner. Garth Hudson was a guest on accordion on some dates. Helm played drums and harmonica and sang "The Weight" and "Up on Cripple Creek" each night.

In the televised 1989 Juno Awards celebration, the Band was inducted into the Juno Awards' Hall of Fame. Helm was not present at the ceremony, but a taped segment of him offering his thanks was broadcast after the acceptance speeches by Rick Danko and Robbie Robertson. Richard Manuel's children accepted the award on behalf of their father. To conclude the televised special, Rick Danko, Garth Hudson, and Robbie Robertson performed "The Weight" with Blue Rodeo.

Helm performed with Danko and Hudson as the Band in 1990 at Roger Waters's epic The Wall – Live in Berlin Concert in Germany to an estimated 300,000 to half a million people.

In 1993, Helm published an autobiography entitled This Wheel's on Fire: Levon Helm and the Story of the Band.

The Midnight Ramble
Helm's performance career in the 2000s revolved mainly around the Midnight Ramble at his home and studio, "The Barn," in Woodstock, New York. These concerts, featuring Helm and various musical guests, allowed him to raise money for his medical bills and to resume performing after a bout with cancer that nearly ended his career.

In the late 1990s, Helm was diagnosed with throat cancer after suffering hoarseness. Advised to undergo a laryngectomy, he instead underwent an arduous regimen of radiation treatments at Memorial Sloan–Kettering Cancer Center in New York City. The tumor was then successfully removed, but Helm's vocal cords were damaged, and his clear, powerful tenor voice was replaced by a quiet rasp. Initially Helm only played drums and relied on guest vocalists at the Rambles, but eventually his singing voice grew stronger. On January 10, 2004, he sang again at his Ramble sessions. In 2007, during production of Dirt Farmer, Helm estimated that his singing voice was 80 percent recovered.

The Levon Helm Band featured his daughter Amy Helm, Larry Campbell, Teresa Williams, Jim Weider (The Band's last guitarist), Jimmy Vivino, Mike Merritt, Brian Mitchell, Erik Lawrence, Steven Bernstein, Howard Johnson (tuba player in the horn section on the Band's Rock of Ages and The Last Waltz), Jay Collins (Helm's now former son-in-law), Byron Isaacs, and blues harmonica player Little Sammy Davis. Helm hosted Midnight Rambles that were open to the public at his home in Woodstock.

The Midnight Ramble was an outgrowth of an idea Helm explained to Martin Scorsese in The Last Waltz. Earlier in the 20th century, Helm recounted, traveling medicine shows and music shows such as F. S. Wolcott's Original Rabbit's Foot Minstrels, featuring African-American blues singers and dancers, would put on titillating performances in rural areas. (This was also turned into a song by the Band, "The W.S. Walcott Medicine Show," with the name altered so the lyric was easier to sing.)

"After the finale, they'd have the midnight ramble," Helm told Scorsese. With young children off the premises, the show resumed: "The songs would get a little bit juicier. The jokes would get a little funnier and the prettiest dancer would really get down and shake it a few times. A lot of the rock and roll duck walks and moves came from that."

Artists who performed at the Rambles include Helm's former bandmate Garth Hudson, Elvis Costello, Emmylou Harris, Dr. John, Mavis Staples, Chris Robinson, Allen Toussaint, Donald Fagen and Jon Herington of Steely Dan, Jimmy Vivino (of the house band on Late Night with Conan O'Brien), the Max Weinberg 7, My Morning Jacket, Billy Bob Thornton, Alexis P. Suter, Sean Costello, the Muddy Waters Tribute Band, Pinetop Perkins, Hubert Sumlin, Carolyn Wonderland, Kris Kristofferson, Gillian Welch, David Rawlings, Justin Townes Earle, Bow Thayer, Luther "Guitar Junior" Johnson, Rickie Lee Jones, Kate Taylor, Ollabelle, the Holmes Brothers, Catherine Russell, Norah Jones, Arlen Roth, Elvis Perkins in Dearland, Phil Lesh (along with his sons Grahame and Brian), Hot Tuna (Jorma Kaukonen introduced the group as "the Secret Squirrels"), Michael Angelo D'Arrigo with various members of the Sistine Chapel, Johnny Johnson, Ithalia, David Bromberg, the Youngers, and Grace Potter and the Nocturnals.

During this period, Helm switched to the matched grip and adopted a less busy, greatly simplified drumming style, as opposed to the traditional grip he used during his years with the Band.

Helm was busy touring every year during the 2000s, generally traveling by tour bus to venues in eastern Canada and the eastern United States. After 2007, he performed in large venues such the Beacon Theatre in New York. Dr. John and Warren Haynes (the Allman Brothers Band, Gov't Mule) and Garth Hudson played at the concerts along with several other guests. At a show in Vancouver Elvis Costello joined to sing "Tears of Rage". The Alexis P. Suter Band was a frequent opening act. Helm was a favorite of radio personality Don Imus and was frequently featured on Imus in the Morning. In the summer of 2009, it was reported that a reality television series centering on the Midnight Ramble was in development.

In 2012, Levon Helm and his "midnight rambles" were featured on the PBS Arts site, "Sound Tracks: Music Without Borders," including a poignant last interview with PBS's Marco Werman.

Dirt Farmer and comeback
The autumn of 2007 saw the release of Dirt Farmer, Helm's first studio solo album since 1982. Dedicated to his parents and co-produced by his daughter Amy, the album combines traditional tunes Levon recalled from his youth with newer songs (by Steve Earle, Paul Kennerley, and others) which flow from similar historical streams. The album was released to almost immediate critical acclaim, and earned him a Grammy Award in the Traditional Folk Album category for 2007. Also in 2007, Helm recorded "Toolin' Around Woodstock", an album with Arlen Roth on which Levon played drums and sang Sweet Little 16 and "Crying Time." This album also featured Levon's daughter Amy, and Roth's daughter Lexie, along with Sonny Landreth and Bill Kirchen.

Helm declined to attend the Grammy Awards ceremony, instead holding a "Midnight Gramble" and celebrating the birth of his grandson, Lavon (Lee) Henry Collins.

In 2008, Helm performed at Warren Haynes's Mountain Jam Music Festival in Hunter, New York playing alongside Haynes on the last day of the three-day festival. Helm also joined guitarist Bob Weir and his band RatDog on stage as they closed out the festival. Helm performed to great acclaim at the 2008 Bonnaroo Music Festival in Manchester, Tennessee.

Helm drummed on a couple of tracks for Jorma Kaukonen's February 2009 album River of Time, recorded at the Levon Helm studio.

Helm released the album Electric Dirt on his own label on June 30, 2009. Like Dirt Farmer, an aim of Electric Dirt was to capture of feel of Helm's Midnight Rambles. The album won a best album Grammy for the newly created Americana category in 2010. Helm performed on the CBS television program Late Show with David Letterman on July 9, 2009. He also toured that same year in a supporting role with the band Black Crowes.

A documentary on Helm's day-to-day life, entitled Ain't in It for My Health: A Film About Levon Helm was released in March 2010. Directed by Jacob Hatley, it made its debut at the South by Southwest film festival in Austin, Texas and went on to be screened at the Los Angeles Film Festival in June 2010. The film had a limited release in select theaters in the United States in the spring of 2013 and was released on DVD and Blu-ray later that year.

On May 11, 2011, Helm released Ramble at the Ryman, a live album recorded during his performance of September 17, 2008 at the Ryman Auditorium in Nashville. The album features Helm's band playing six songs by the Band and other cover material, including some songs from previous Helm solo releases. The album won the Grammy Award for Best Americana Album.

Some of his last sessions recorded in 2011 with Mavis Staples would be released in 2022 as Carry Me Home.

Illness and death

In April 2012, during the Rock and Roll Hall of Fame induction ceremonies in Cleveland, Robbie Robertson sent "love and prayers" to Helm, fueling speculation about Helm's health. Helm had previously cancelled a number of performances, citing health issues or a slipped disk in his back; his final performances took place in Tarrytown, New York at Tarrytown Music Hall on March 24, and a final Midnight Ramble (with Los Lobos as the opening act) in Woodstock on March 31.

On April 17, 2012, Helm's wife Sandy and daughter Amy revealed that he had end-stage throat cancer. They posted the following message on Helm's website:

On April 18, Robertson revealed on his Facebook page that he had a long visit with Helm at Memorial Sloan-Kettering Cancer Center the previous Sunday. On the same day, Garth Hudson posted on his personal website that he was "too sad for words". He then left a link for a video of himself and the Alexis P. Suter Band performing Bob Dylan's song "Knocking on Heaven's Door". Helm died on April 19 from complications of throat cancer at age 71.

Fans were invited to a public wake at Helm's Barn studio complex on April 26. Approximately 2,000 fans came to pay their respects to the rock icon. The following day, after a private funeral service and a procession through the streets of Woodstock, Helm was interred in the Woodstock Cemetery, within sight of the grave of his longtime bandmate and friend Rick Danko. Former President Bill Clinton issued a statement following Helm's passing.

Legacy
George Harrison said that while writing his 1970 song "All Things Must Pass", he imagined Levon Helm singing it.

Elton John's lyricist, Bernie Taupin named the song "Levon" after Helm, although the song is not actually about him. Both John and Taupin cited that they were inspired by Helm; Taupin saying in various interviews that they would "go down to their favourite record stores to buy The Band's records" along with Elton. In 1994, Helm was inducted into the Rock and Roll Hall of Fame as a member of the Band.

Marc Cohn wrote the song "Listening to Levon" in 2007.
"The Man behind the Drums," written by Robert Earl Keen and Bill Whitbeck, appeared on Keen's 2009 album The Rose Hotel.
Tracy K. Smith's 2011 poem "Alternate Take", included in her Pulitzer Prize–winning collection Life on Mars, is dedicated to Helm. On the day of Helm's death, April 19, 2012, Tom Petty & the Heartbreakers, in a concert at the First Bank Center in Broomfield, Colorado, paid tribute to Levon by performing their song "The Best of Everything" and dedicating it to him.

At a concert on May 2, 2012, at the Prudential Center in Newark, NJ, Bruce Springsteen and the E Street Band performed "The Weight" as a tribute to Helm. Springsteen called Helm "one of the greatest, greatest voices in country, rockabilly and rock 'n' roll ... staggering ... while playing the drums. Both his voice and his drumming were so incredibly personal. He had a feel on the drums that comes out of certain place in the past and you can't replicate it." Springsteen also said it was one of the songs that he had played with drummer Max Weinberg in Weinberg's audition with the band.

On June 2, 2012, at Mountain Jam, Gov't Mule along with the Levon Helm Band (with Lukas Nelson coming on stage for the closing song) played a tribute set, including "The Night They Drove Old Dixie Down," "Up on Cripple Creek,""It Makes No Difference," and closing with "The Weight".

A tribute concert called Love for Levon took place at the Izod Center in East Rutherford, New Jersey on October 3, 2012. The concert featured many special guests who had collaborated with and were inspired by Helm and the Band, including Roger Waters,    Garth Hudson, Joe Walsh, Gregg Allman, Bruce Hornsby, Jorma Kaukonen, John Mayer, Mavis Staples, My Morning Jacket, Marc Cohn, John Hiatt, Allen Toussaint, Jakob Dylan, Mike Gordon, and others. Proceeds from the concert were to "help support the lasting legacy of Levon Helm by helping his estate keep ownership of his home, barn and studio, and to continue the Midnight Ramble Sessions".

At the 2013 Grammy Awards, the Zac Brown Band, Mumford & Sons, Elton John, Mavis Staples, T-Bone Burnett, and Alabama Shakes singer Brittany Howard performed "The Weight" as a tribute to Levon and other recently deceased musicians. They also dedicated the song to the victims of the Sandy Hook Elementary School shooting. In May 2013, the New York State Legislature approved a resolution to name State Route 375—the road which connects State Route 28 with the town of Woodstock—"Levon Helm Memorial Boulevard". Governor Andrew Cuomo signed the bill on June 20, 2013. In July 2017, U.S. 49 from Marvell, Arkansas to Helena–West Helena was named The Levon Helm Memorial Highway by Act 810 of the Arkansas State Legislature. The Levon Helm Legacy Project is raising money to commission a bronze bust of Helm and to restore his boyhood home. The house, originally located in Turkey Scratch, Arkansas, was moved in 2015 to Marvell, where Helm attended school.

Personal life
Helm met singer-songwriter Libby Titus in April 1969, while the Band was recording its second album. They began a lengthy relationship which produced daughter Amy Helm (born December 3, 1970). Amy formed the band Ollabelle and performed with her father's band at the Midnight Rambles and other concerts.

Helm met Sandra Dodd in 1975 in California, while he was still involved with Titus. Helm and Dodd were married on September 7, 1981. They had no children together.

Discography

Studio
Levon Helm & the RCO All-Stars (1977)
Levon Helm (1978)
American Son (1980)
Levon Helm (1982)
Dirt Farmer (2007)
Electric Dirt (2009)

Live
The Midnight Ramble Sessions, Volume One (2006)
The Midnight Ramble Sessions, Volume Two (2006)
Levon Helm & the RCO All Stars: Live at the Palladium NYC, New Years Eve 1977 (2006)
FestivalLink.Net presents: Levon Helm Band MerleFest Ramble (MerleFest, NC 4/26/08)
Ramble at the Ryman (2011)
The Midnight Ramble Sessions, Volume Three (2014)
Carry Me Home (2022, with Mavis Staples)

Other
The Legend of Jesse James (1980)
Souvenir, Vol. 1 (1998)
The Imus Ranch Record (2008)
The Imus Ranch Record II (2010)
The Lost Notebooks of Hank Williams (2011)

With John P. Hammond
So Many Roads (1965)

With Muddy Waters
The Muddy Waters Woodstock Album (Chess, 1975)

With Eric Clapton
No Reason to Cry (RSO, 1976)

With Jorma Kaukonen
River of Time (2009)

Filmography

References

External links

[ AllMusic]

 
1940 births
2012 deaths
ABC Records artists
American autobiographers
American country singer-songwriters
American country rock musicians
American folk rock musicians
American male singer-songwriters
American mandolinists
American multi-instrumentalists
American rock drummers
Deaths from cancer in New York (state)
Grammy Award winners
Male actors from Arkansas
People from Phillips County, Arkansas
Singer-songwriters from Arkansas
The Band members
Vanguard Records artists
Ringo Starr & His All-Starr Band members